Montréal/Hydro Aéroport de Montréal Water Airport  is a certified airport located on the Saint Lawrence River at Longueuil,  northeast of Montreal, Quebec, Canada.

See also
 List of airports in the Montreal area

References

Certified airports in Quebec
Seaplane bases in Quebec